Pink Hill is an unincorporated community in Jackson County, in the U.S. state of Missouri. It is located on Pink Hill Road roughly between South Howell Road and South Fields Road.

History
Pinkhill was once a small thriving rural community. The town consisted of 10 acres purchased from R.G. Pinkard, and was recorded with Jackson County, Missouri on November 21, 1854, and recorded as Pink Hill, Missouri.  The town was platted with 40 lots, with two 30 ft wide streets, Main Street and Locust Street, and two alleys 16.5 ft wide.  Pink Hill, Missouri set on the southeast corner of Pink Hill Road and Howell Road.  A post office called Pink Hill was established in 1854, and remained in operation until 1902. There are two conclusions as to how the community received its name.  The first was it was named for a hill near the town site where pink flowers grew. 
The second was the town site was purchased from R. G. Pinkard and may have derived from the Pinkard's name.

The town was established as a rural community, hopeful of sustained development when Chicago and Alton Railroad surveyed this area of Sni-A-Bar township in the 1850s to build a rail line. They were hopeful that the rail line would pass through the community and establish a railroad depot.  Instead of this occurring the Chicago and Alton Railroad laid the rail line 3 miles south, through the communities of Oak Grove and Blue Springs in 1878.

To take advantage of the commerce that the railroad would bring, the majority of the towns businesses and residents quickly moved to the area known today as Grain Valley, Missouri.  The residents from Pink Hill, Missouri was instrumental in starting the community of Grain Valley, Missouri.

With the decline of businesses the small town eventually all but disappeared. All that is left today of the community, is in old church, located at 35305 East Pink Hill Road, and of course Pink Hill Road.  The old Pink Hill Church today, is a private residence.

References

Unincorporated communities in Jackson County, Missouri
Unincorporated communities in Missouri